Mohra Sharif (Holy Village; Mohra for small village and Sharif for holy or noble) is a spiritual center and home of the Sufi order is a Naqshbandi in origin, and is based in a small village called Mohra Sharif located in the Murree Hills of Punjab, near the Pakistani capital of Islamabad. It was made into a spiritual center by Baba Ji Khawaja Muhammad Qasim Sadiq (b. 1263 A.H.), a purported Sufi shaikh of this area.

Attending Scholar is "Pir Mujtaba Farooq Gul Badshah"
Conferences celebrated at Darbar Mohra Sharif Rawalpindi:
 Annual Millad E Mustafa S.A.W. Conference.
 Annual Quran Sharif Conference.
 Annual Urs Paak.
 Annual Peace Conference.
 Annual Muharram Sharif Conference.
 Monthly Mehfil.
 Weekly Zikr Mehfil.
 Twice a year, in the second week of May and November the Urs ceremony is held.

Mohra Sharif is a spiritual center and a home of the Sufi order is a Naqshbandi in origin, called Darbar Mohra Sharif Rawalpindi located in the Mohra Sharif, Murree, District Rawalpindi of Punjab, near the Pakistani capital of Islamabad.

References

External links
Mohra Sharif site 2

Populated places in Rawalpindi District
Sufism in Pakistan
Sufi shrines in Pakistan